The Doctor of Engineering, or Engineering Doctorate, (abbreviated DEng or EngD) is a degree awarded on the basis of advanced study and research in engineering and applied science for solving problems in industry. In the United States, it is a terminal professional doctorate. A DEng/EngD is equivalent to a PhD in engineering, but different in that it has a solid industrial base and an additional taught element. The degree is usually aimed toward working professionals.

The DEng/EngD along with the PhD represents the highest academic qualification in engineering, and the successful completion of either in engineering is generally required to gain employment as a full-time, tenure-track university professor or postdoctoral researcher in the field. However, due to its nature, a DEng/EngD graduate might be more suitable for the Professor of Practice position. Individuals can use the academic title doctor, which is often represented via the English honorific "Dr”.

DEng/EngD candidates submit a significant project, typically referred to as a thesis or praxis, consisting of a body of applied and practical methods/products with the main goal of solving complex industrial problems. Candidates must defend this work before a panel of expert examiners called a thesis or dissertation committee.

International equivalent qualifications 
Countries following the German/US model of education usually have similar requirements for awarding PhD (Eng) and doctor of engineering degrees. The common degree abbreviations in the US are DEng/EngD, DEngSc/EngScD, whereas in Germany it is more commonly known as Dr-Ing The common degree abbreviation in the Netherlands is Professional Doctorate in Engineering (PDEng), which is  equivalent to the EngD (as of 1 September 2022, the PDEng title in The Netherlands will be renamed to EngD).

History 
To be admitted as a doctoral student, one must hold a Master's degree in engineering or related science subject and pass a comprehensive entrance exam. The student must complete necessary course work, be taught examinable courses, perform independent research under the supervision of a qualified doctoral advisor, and pass the thesis defense. The degree requires a high level of expertise in the theoretical aspects of relevant scientific principles and experience with details of the implementation of theory on realistic problems. The D.Eng. takes three to six years (full-time) to complete and has compulsory taught components and coursework/projects and is granted in recognition of high achievement in scholarship and an ability to apply engineering fundamentals to the solution of complex technical problems.

A Doctor of Engineering degree awarded by universities in China, Japan, and South Korea is equivalent to a PhD degree. To be admitted as a doctoral student, one must hold a master's degree in the same or related subject and pass a comprehensive entrance exam. The student must complete necessary course work, perform independent research under the supervision of a qualified Doctoral Advisor, and pass the thesis defense. It usually takes more than three years for a student with an M.S. Degree to complete his/her doctoral study. However, there are few areas of study (such as Materials Science, Polymer Technology, and Biomedical Engineering) where both Doctor of Science and Doctor of Engineering can be awarded depending upon the graduate school which houses the department.

In Germany the doctoral degree in engineering is called Doktoringenieur (Doktor der Ingenieurwissenschaften, Dr.-Ing.) and is usually earned after four to six years of research and completing a dissertation. A researcher pursuing a doctorate needs to hold a master's degree or the Diplom-Ingenieur degree (Dipl.-Ing.).

In France the degree of "Doctor-Engineer" (docteur-ingénieur) was a formerly applied science research degree. It was discontinued after 1984 and engineers wishing to go further as researchers now seek a PhD.

British Higher Doctorate 
In the United Kingdom, the D.Eng. degree was traditionally awarded as a higher doctorate on the basis of a significant contribution to some field of engineering over the course of a career. However, since 1992 some British universities have introduced the Engineering Doctorate, abbreviated as "EngD", which is instead a research doctorate and regarded in the UK as equivalent to a PhD.

Modern British Engineering Doctorate 
The Engineering Doctorate scheme is a British postgraduate education programme promoted by the UK's Engineering and Physical Sciences Research Council (EPSRC).  The programme is undertaken for over four years.  Students conduct PhD-equivalent research and undertake taught business and technical courses whilst working closely with an industrial sponsor.  Successful candidates are awarded the degree of Doctor of Engineering (EngD) and are addressed as doctor.

In the UK a similar formation to doctorate is the NVQ 8 or QCF 8. However, a doctoral degree typically incorporates a research project which must offer an original contribution to knowledge within an academic subject area; an element which NVQs lack.

The Engineering Doctorate (EngD) scheme was established by the EPSRC in 1992 following the recommendations of the 1990 Engineering Doctorate Report, produced by a working group chaired by Professor John Parnaby. The scheme was launched with five centres - at Warwick, UMIST and Manchester universities and a Welsh consortium led by University College Swansea. After a 1997 review, a further tranche of five centres were established, and further centres were added in 2001 and 2006 following calls by EPSRC in particular areas of identified national need.

In a 2006 stakeholder survey of the scheme conducted on behalf of EPSRC it was found that the quality of output of research engineers was perceived to match or exceed that of a PhD. However, the majority of respondents disagreed with claims that EngDs were recruited to higher-paid posts than PhDs or that EngDs were more desirable to employers than PhDs.  Observations were made that the EngD was not widely known, and that universities may offer EngD degrees that were not necessarily of the format promoted by the EPSRC.

A March 2007 "Review of the EPSRC Engineering Doctorate Centres" noted that since 1992, some 1230 research engineers had been enrolled, sponsored by over 510 different companies (28 had sponsored at least six REs), at 22 centres based at 14 universities (some jointly run by several collaborating universities). The panel remained convinced of the value and performance of the EngD scheme, and made six key recommendations including clearer brand definition, academic study of the longer-term impacts of the scheme, promotion of the scheme to potential new sponsors, business sectors and REs, work with the Engineering Council UK to develop a career path for REs to Chartered Engineer status, creation of a virtual "EngD Academy", and increased resources for the scheme.

Work on establishing an Association of Engineering Doctorates began in 2010.

Relationship between DEng/EngD and PhD 
In some countries, the Doctor of Engineering and the PhD in Engineering are equivalent degrees. Both doctorates are research doctorates representing the highest academic qualification in engineering. As such, both EngD and PhD programs require students to develop original research leading to a dissertation defense. Furthermore, both doctorates enable holders to become faculty members at academic institutions. The EngD and PhD in Engineering are terminal degrees, allowing the recipient to obtain a tenure-track position.

In other cases, the distinction is one of orientation and intended outcomes. The Doctor of Engineering degree is designed for practitioners who wish to apply the knowledge they gain in a business or technical environment. Unlike a Doctor of Philosophy (PhD) degree program, wherein research leads to foundational work that is published in industry journals, the EngD demands that research be applied to solving a real-world problem using the latest engineering concepts and tools. The program culminates in the production of a thesis, dissertation, or praxis, for use by practicing engineers to address a common concern or challenge. Research toward the EngD is “applied” rather than basic.

The PhD is highly focused on developing theoretical knowledge, while the EngD emphasizes applied research. Upon completion, graduates of PhD programs generally migrate to full-time faculty positions in academia, while those of EngD programs re-emerge in the industry as applied researchers or Executives. If working full-time in industry, graduates of EngD and PhD programs often become adjunct professors in top undergraduate and graduate degree programs.

List of Universities or Research Centres

Malaysia 
The following universities in Malaysia offer Doctor of Engineering degrees:
 University of Malaya
 University Sains Malaysia
 University of Putra Malaysia
 National University of Malaysia
 University of Technology Malaysia
 Universiti Tunku Abdul Rahman

United States 
The following universities which also happen to have an ABET accredited undergraduate degree offer Doctor of Engineering degrees:
 Cleveland State University 
 Colorado State University
 Columbia University 
 George Washington University 
 Johns Hopkins University
 Lamar University 
 Morgan State University 
 Old Dominion University 
 Penn State University 
 Southern Methodist University
 Texas A&M 
 University of California, Berkeley 
 University of Dayton
 University of Michigan–Ann Arbor
 University of Michigan–Dearborn

This listing is incomplete. ABET accreditation is not applicable to doctoral programs. Therefore, there are a number of schools with regionally accredited doctoral programs which are not on this list.

United Kingdom 
In 2009, Engineering Doctorate schemes were offered by 45 UK universities, both singly or in partnership with other universities as industrial doctorate centres. Students on the scheme are encouraged to describe themselves as 'research engineers' rather than 'research students' and as of 2009 the minimum funding level was £1,500 higher than the minimum funding level for PhD students. Advocates of the scheme like to draw attention to the fact that EngD students share some courses with MBA students.

The following EPSRC-funded centres have offered EngDs:
 Advanced Forming and Manufacture (University of Strathclyde)
 Biopharmaceutical Process Development (Newcastle University)
 Bioprocess Engineering Leadership (University College London)
 Centre for Doctoral Training in Non-Destructive Evaluation (Imperial College London, Bristol, Nottingham, Strathclyde, Warwick)
 Centre for Doctoral Training in Sustainable Materials and Manufacturing (University of Warwick, University of Exeter, Cranfield University)
 Centre for Digital Entertainment (University of Bath, Bournemouth University)
 COATED: Centre Of Advanced Training for Engineering Doctorates (Swansea University)
 Doctoral Training Partnership (DTP) in Structural Metallic Systems for Gas Turbine Applications (Universities of Cambridge, Swansea and Birmingham)
 Efficient Fossil Energy Technologies (The Universities of Nottingham, University of Birmingham, and Loughborough University)
 Engineering Doctoral Centre in High Value, Low Environmental Impact Manufacturing (University of Warwick)
 Formulation Engineering (University of Birmingham)
 Industrial Doctorate Centre in Composites Manufacture (University of Bristol, University of Nottingham, University of Manchester, Cranfield University)
 Industrial Doctoral Centre for Offshore Renewable Energy (IDCORE) (Universities of Edinburgh, Strathclyde and Exeter)
 Innovative and Collaborative Construction Engineering (Loughborough University)
 Large-scale Complex IT Systems (Universities of Leeds, Oxford, St Andrews and York)
 Manufacturing Technology Engineering Doctorate Centre (MTEDC - The Universities of Nottingham, University of Birmingham, and Loughborough University)
 Machining Science (University of Sheffield)
 MATTER: Manufacturing Advances Through Training Engineering Researchers (Swansea University)
 Micro & Nano-Materials and Technologies (University of Surrey)
 Molecular Modelling and Materials Science (University College London)
 Nuclear Engineering (Imperial College London, University of Manchester)
 Optics and Photonics Technologies (Heriot-Watt (lead), Glasgow, St Andrews, Strathclyde and the Scottish University Physics Alliance)
 STREAM - IDC for the Water Sector (Cranfield University, Imperial College London, University of Exeter, University of Sheffield, Newcastle University)
 Sustainability for Engineering and Energy Systems (University of Surrey)
 Systems (University of Bristol and University of Bath)
 Systems Approaches to Biomedical Science (University of Oxford)
 Technologies for Sustainable Built Environments (University of Reading)
 Transport and the Environment (University of Southampton)
 Urban Sustainability and Resilience (University College London)
 Virtual Environments, Imaging and Visualisation (University College London)

The following EPSRC-funded centres have offered EngDs:

EPSRC and NERC Industrial Centre for Doctoral Training for Offshore Renewable Energy - IDCORE (University of Edinburgh, University of Exeter, Strathclyde University and the Scottish Association for Marine Sciences)
Renewable Energy Marine Structures (REMS) (Cranfield University, University of Oxford and University of Strathclyde)
Centre for Doctoral Training in Sustainable Materials and Manufacturing (University of Warwick, University of Exeter, Cranfield University)
Industrial Doctoral Centre for Offshore Renewable Energy (University of Edinburgh, University of Exeter, Strathclyde University, the Scottish Association for Marine Sciences and HR-Wallingford)
Industrial Doctorate Centre in Composites Manufacture (University of Bristol, University of Nottingham, University of Manchester, Cranfield University)
Centre for Digital Entertainment (University of Bath, Bournemouth University)
Innovative and Collaborative Construction Engineering (Loughborough University)
Large-scale Complex IT Systems (Universities of Leeds, Oxford, St Andrews and York)
Bioprocess Engineering Leadership (University College London)
Systems (University of Bristol and University of Bath)
Micro & Nano-Materials and Technologies (University of Surrey)
Nuclear Engineering (Imperial College London, University of Manchester)
Optics and Photonics Technologies (Heriot-Watt (lead), Glasgow, St Andrews, Strathclyde and the Scottish University Physics Alliance)
Sustainability for Engineering and Energy Systems (University of Surrey)
Transport and the Environment (University of Southampton)
Molecular Modelling and Materials Science (University College London)
Urban Sustainability and Resilience (University College London)
Biopharmaceutical Process Development (Newcastle University)
STREAM - IDC for the Water Sector (Cranfield University, Imperial College London, University of Exeter, University of Sheffield, Newcastle University)
Systems Approaches to Biomedical Science (University of Oxford)
Technologies for Sustainable Built Environments (University of Reading)
Formulation Engineering (University of Birmingham)
Efficient Fossil Energy Technologies (The Universities of Nottingham, University of Birmingham, and Loughborough University)
Manufacturing Technology Engineering Doctorate Centre (MTEDC - The Universities of Nottingham, University of Birmingham, and Loughborough University)
Centre for Doctoral Training in Non-Destructive Evaluation (Imperial College London, Bristol, Nottingham, Strathclyde, Warwick)
Advanced Forming and Manufacture (University of Strathclyde)
Machining Science (University of Sheffield)
MATTER: Manufacturing Advances Through Training Engineering Researchers (Swansea University)
COATED: Centre Of Advanced Training for Engineering Doctorates (Swansea University)
Doctoral Training Partnership (DTP) in Structural Metallic Systems for Gas Turbine Applications (Universities of Cambridge, Swansea and Birmingham)
Engineering Doctoral Centre in High Value, Low Environmental Impact Manufacturing (University of Warwick)

See also
British degree abbreviations
Doctor of Business Administration
Doctor of Education
Doctor of Philosophy
Doctor of Science
Doctor of Technology, an academic PhD-level degree
Doktoringenieur, the equivalent engineering doctore degree in Germany.
Engineering Doctorate, a PhD-level degree awarded in the UK.
Engineer's degree
Higher education
List of education articles by country

References

External links 
 IDCORE's website
 EPSRC's website
 Promotional pamphlet by EPSRC (pdf)
 Article about the EngD 
 Association of EngDs UK

External links
 IDCORE's website
 EPSRC's website
 Promotional pamphlet by EPSRC (pdf)
 Article about the EngD 
 Association of EngDs UK

Engineering
Engineering education